The Etz Ahayim Synagogue (Hebrew: קהל קדוש עץ החיים), also known as the Ortaköy Synagogue, is synagogue located in Ortaköy, Istanbul, Turkey, on the coast near the right leg of Bosphorus Bridge. The synagogue was totally destroyed by fire in 1941 with only the marble Aron Kodesh remaining intact.  The synagogue was subsequently rebuilt.

See also
 History of the Jews in Turkey
 List of synagogues in Turkey

References

"Ortaköy ve Museviler" by Aaron Kohen 2011

External links
 Chief Rabbinate of Turkey
 Shalom Newspaper - The main Jewish newspaper in Turkey

Synagogues in Istanbul
Beşiktaş
Rebuilt synagogues